

Earthquakes

See also
Geology of Yemen

References 

Sources

Yemen
 
Earthquakes
Earthquakes